Ra Jong-yil (born 1940) is a former South Korean ambassador who has authored books on politics concerning North Korea.

Education
Ra received a PhD at the University of Cambridge.

Career
Ra served as South Korea's ambassador to the United Kingdom from 2001 to 2003 and as its ambassador to Japan from 2004 to 2007.

Works
In 2013, Ra released a book about Kang Min-chulthe only person who ever admitted involvement with an attempt to assassinate the SouthKorean president in 1983whom Ra described as "one of the countless young men sacrificed in the long rivalry between the two Koreas and then forgotten".

Ra's 2016 book, The Path Taken by Jang Song‑thaek: A Rebellious Outsider, made claims that Kim Jong‑il did not intend for his son, Kim Jong‑un, to succeed him after he died.

References

1940 births
Ambassadors of South Korea to Japan
Ambassadors of South Korea to the United Kingdom
Living people
South Korean writers
Alumni of the University of Cambridge
Naju Na clan
People of the National Intelligence Service (South Korea)
People of the Agency for National Security Planning